Film Xtra is a film review programme broadcast on the UK channel Film 24, broadcast between 2009 and 2011. It featured film news and reviews, DVD release information and backstage interviews and features.

The programme aired weekly on the channel.

2009 British television series debuts
2011 British television series endings
Film criticism television series